The 2014–15 season was the 129th in the history of Luton Town Football Club and the club's first back in the Football League since the 2008–09 season following its promotion from the Conference Premier during the previous season. Luton finished in eighth position, one place and three points outside the play-offs.

Luton had an indifferent start to the campaign before a strong run of results placed the club in a four-way battle for the automatic promotion spots for much of the season, alongside Burton Albion, Wycombe Wanderers and Shrewsbury Town. A collapse in Luton's form in the final third of the season left them struggling to remain in the promotion positions and, despite a late run of positive results, the club fell just short of competing in the play-offs.

This article covers the period from 1 July 2014 to 30 June 2015.

Background

Luton manager John Still had joined the club in February 2013 at a time when promotion from the Conference Premier looked unlikely following a poor run of league results under previous manager Paul Buckle. Still guided the club to a seventh-placed finish in its fourth season in non-League football. He began building his own squad a month before the last game of the 2012–13 campaign, continuing to do so through pre-season and the beginning of the 2013–14 season, with twelve new players entering Kenilworth Road and eleven leaving.

A slow start to the 2013–14 season left the club in mid-table, but this soon gave way to a club-record 27-match unbeaten run with Luton playing an attacking style of football that resulted in them scoring 78 goals. The club reached the top of the table in December 2013 and Still ensured momentum through the busy post-Christmas schedule by augmenting the squad with talented young players from Premier League academies, such as Pelly Ruddock Mpanzu and Cameron McGeehan. Luton remained in first position for the rest of the campaign as they comfortably won promotion to League Two, with nearest rivals Cambridge United 19 points behind – the largest points gap between first and second in Conference history. The club accumulated 101 points and kept 23 clean sheets, both club records, while also equalling the record for the fewest goals (35) conceded over a season.

Club

Squad

New Contracts

Transfers

In

Summer

Winter

Out

Summer

Winter

Loans in

Summer

Winter

Loans out

Summer

Winter

Overall transfer activity

Spending
Summer:  £100,000

Total:  £100,000

Income
Summer:  £500,000

Total:  £500,000

Expenditure
Summer:  £400,000

Total:  £400,000

Competitions

Pre Season

League Two

League table

Results summary

Results by Matchday

Matches

FA Cup

League Cup

Football League Trophy

Statistics

Appearances

Goals

Clean sheets

Discipline

Summary

Honours

Team

Individuals

Players

Manager

References

External links 

Luton Town F.C. seasons
Luton Town